The Plafond knot, with its spiral-like center and rectangular border, was inspired by the decorations found on the dome-like central sections of ceilings in Chinese temples and palaces. The ceilings, which are divided into nine rectangular sections, three across and three deep, each have a domed apex composed of a circular design filled with auspicious motifs surrounded by a complementary motif which radiates out to the rectangular border. This effect is echoed in the plafond knot, which is made by hooking up and tightening a number of flat knots.

The knot is also known by other names:

See also
List of knots
Chinese knotting

External links
 Tying video

References 

Decorative knots